Molybdic acid refers to hydrated forms of molybdenum trioxide and related species.  The monohydrate (MoO3·H2O) and the dihydrate (MoO3·2H2O) are well characterized.  They are yellow diamagnetic solids.

Structure of the solids

Solid forms of molybdic acid are coordination polymers.  The monohydrate MoO3·H2O consists of layers of octahedrally coordinated MoO5·(H2O) units where 4 vertices are shared.  The dihydrate (image shown above) has the same layer structure with the "extra" H2O molecule intercalated between the layers.

Structure of molybdic acid in solution
In acidified aqueous solutions of molybdic acid, the complex MoO3(H2O)3 is observed.  Once again, molybdenum adopts octahedral molecular geometry, probably with three oxo ligands and three aquo ligands.

The salts of molybdic acid are called molybdates.  They arise by adding base to solutions of molybdic acid.

Applications
Many molybdenum oxides are used as heterogeneous catalysts, e.g. for oxidations.  Molybdic acid and its salts are used to make the Froehde reagent for the presumptive identification of alkaloids.

References

Hydrogen compounds
Acids
Molybdates
Coordination polymers